Walden–Jackson County Airport  is a mile northeast of Walden, in Jackson County, Colorado.

Facilities
It has two runways: 4/22 is 5,901 by 75 feet (1,799 x 23 m) asphalt; 17/35 is 4,020 by 100 feet (1,225 x 30 m) turf.

In 2008 the airport had 1,000 general aviation operations. Ten aircraft were then based at this airport: 8 single-engine, 1 multi-engine and 1 jet.

References

External links 
 Aerial photo as of 7 September 1999 from USGS The National Map
 
 

Airports in Colorado
Buildings and structures in Jackson County, Colorado
Transportation in Jackson County, Colorado